The year 1941 in architecture involved some significant events.

Buildings and structures

Buildings

 Hoover Tower in Stanford, California, United States, designed by Arthur Brown, Jr., completed.
 Fen Court at Peterhouse, Cambridge, England, designed by H. C. Hughes and Peter Bicknell, completed.
 Dublin Airport passenger terminal, Ireland, designed by Desmond FitzGerald, opened.
 Australian War Memorial in Canberra, Australia, completed.
 Lord Elgin Hotel in Ottawa, Ontario, Canada, completed.
 Smith-Reynolds Airport in Winston-Salem, North Carolina, United States, completed.
 Replica of the Parthenon, in concrete, in Nashville, Tennessee, completed.
 Presidential Palace of Tirana, in Tirana, Albania, completed.
 Karlskoga city hall in Sweden designed by Sune Lindström.
 National and University Library of Slovenia in Ljubljana, designed by Jože Plečnik in 1930/31, completed.
 Biblioteca Cantonale (Cantonal Library) in Lugano, Canton of Ticino, Switzerland, designed by Rino and Carlo Tami, completed.
 St Peter's Church, Grange Park, Enfield, London, designed by Cyril Farey, built using recycled materials.
 Willow Run Bomber Plant, Michigan, designed by Albert Kahn.
 Schwerbelastungskörper, Berlin, Germany, built by Dyckerhoff & Widmann AG.
 Kahn House in Ngaio, New Zealand, designed by Ernst Plischke, completed.

Awards
 RIBA Royal Gold Medal – Frank Lloyd Wright.
 Grand Prix de Rome, architecture: no competition.

Births

 March 3 – Vlado Milunić, Czech architect (died 2022)
 April 1 – David Childs, American architect
 May 6 – Peter Corrigan, Australian architect (died 2016)
 June 1 – Toyo Ito, Japanese architect
 September 13 – Tadao Ando, Japanese "critical regionalist" architect
 approximate date – Yasmeen Lari, Pakistani architect

Deaths
 February 12 – Charles Voysey, English Arts and Crafts designer and domestic architect (born 1857)
 August 26 – Sir Alfred Gelder, English architect and politician active in Kingston upon Hull (born 1855)
 September 2 – H. Craig Severance, American architect active in New York (born 1879)
 December 30 – El Lissitzky, Russian artist, designer, photographer, typographer, polemicist and architect (born 1890)

References